Irina Litovchenko (born 29 May 1950) is a Soviet hurdler. She competed in the women's 100 metres hurdles at the 1980 Summer Olympics.

References

1950 births
Living people
Athletes (track and field) at the 1980 Summer Olympics
Soviet female hurdlers
Olympic athletes of the Soviet Union
Place of birth missing (living people)